Toll of the Desert is a 1935 American western film directed by William Berke and starring Fred Kohler, Jr., Betty Mack, and Roger Williams.

Plot
When a cowboy's covered wagon is attacked by Indians, he becomes convinced that his wife and young son have been killed. Rescued from the attack by a roving band of crooks, the grateful father joins the gang, becoming an outlaw and hired gunman. Unbeknownst to him, his son survives the Indian attack and grows up to become a lawman who eventually has to hunt down his outlaw father.

Cast
 Fred Kohler Jr. as Bill Collins aka Bill Carson
 Betty Mack as Jean Streeter
 Roger Williams as Tom Collins
 Earl Dwire as Joe Carson
 Tom London as Sheriff Jackson
 Ted AdamsTeague
 George Chesebro as Carter - Henchman
 John Elliott as Judge
 Ruth Findlay as	Ruth Carson 
 Ed Cassidy as 	Streeter 
 Barney Beasley as 	Perez - Henchman 
 Budd Buster as 	Bartender
 Herman Hack as Henchman 
 Jack Hendricks as 	Deputy 
 William McCall as 	Stagecoach Driver 
 Milburn Morante as 	Hank 
 Tex Palmer as 	Tex - Henchman

References

Bibliography
 Pitts, Michael R. Poverty Row Studios, 1929–1940. McFarland & Company, 2005.

External links

1935 Western (genre) films
1935 films
American black-and-white films
Commodore Pictures films
American Western (genre) films
Films directed by William A. Berke
1930s English-language films
1930s American films